Girlfriends is a Maldivian web series written and directed by Ibrahim Wisan. It stars Fathimath Myeha, Lahfa Mohamed and Aisha Ali in main roles. The pilot episode of the series was released on 12 August 2021.

Cast and characters

Main
 Fathimath Myeha as Shamla
 Lahfa Mohamed as Hawwa Ibrahim
 Aisha Ali as Zila
 Ahmed Sharif as Firushan

Recurring
 Ahmed Alam as Ayya
 Maria Teresa Pagano as Martina
 Ali Usam as Faya; a neurologist
 Azzam Maumoon as Shimaz Shareef "Sarippe"
 Mohamed Afrah as Arushadbe
 Nathasha Jaleel as Sara

Guest
 Suja Abdullah as a customer (Episode: "Message")
 Hamdhoon Farooq as a customer (Episode: "Money Talks")
 Mariyam Shakeela as Wafira (Episode: "Murderer")
 Hamdhan Farooq as Shiyam (Episode: "Virgin")
 Mahfooz as a musician (Episode: "Virgin")
 Ali Farooq as Taxi driver (Episode: "Crossroads")
 Sharaf Abdulla as Hassan (Episode: "Crossroads")

Episodes

Soundtrack

Release and reception
The pilot episode of the series was made available for streaming on MediaNet Multi Screen on 12 August 2021, to positive reviews from critics.

References

Serial drama television series
Maldivian television shows
Maldivian web series
Films directed by Ibrahim Wisan